This was the first edition of the tournament.

Matías Franco Descotte and Orlando Luz won the title after defeating Treat Huey and Max Schnur 7–5, 1–6, [12–10] in the final.

Seeds

Draw

References

External links
 Main draw

Little Rock Challenger - Doubles
Little Rock Challenger